Aguibou Koné was a candidate in the 2013 Malian presidential election. A former student leader, he announced that he would run for president to defend the colours of a political organisation called "to Yèlè" (this means "to open" in the national language Bambara).

References

Living people
Year of birth missing (living people)
21st-century Malian politicians